Our Own is a Canadian drama film, directed by Jeanne Leblanc and released in 2020. The film stars Émilie Bierre as Magalie Jodoin, a teenage girl in the small town of Sainte-Adeline, Quebec who sets off a local scandal when she gets pregnant.

The film's cast also includes Marianne Farley as Magalie's mother Isabelle, Paul Doucet as the town's mayor Jean-Marc Ricard and Judith Baribeau as Jean-Marc's wife Chantal Grégoire.

The film premiered on February 26, 2020 at the Rendez-vous Québec Cinéma.

Reception

References

External links
 

2020 films
2020 drama films
Canadian drama films
Quebec films
Films set in Quebec
Films shot in Quebec
2020s French-language films
French-language Canadian films
2020s Canadian films